Zephyrium or Zephyrion was a town of ancient Pontus in the territory of the Mosynoeci, located on a promontory of the same name, 90 stadia to the west of Tripolis, mentioned by several ancient authors.

The promontory is identified as Çam Burnu (formerly Zefre Burnu) in Asiatic Turkey, but the town is unlocated.

References

Populated places in ancient Pontus
Former populated places in Turkey
History of Giresun Province